Museo de Arte Contemporáneo or MAC (Spanish for Museum of Contemporary Art) is a modern art museum in Valdivia run by Universidad Austral de Chile. It was founded in 1994 by the then rector of Universidad Austral Manfred Max-Neef and the artist Hernán Miranda. Artists that have had exhibitions at MAC include: Nicanor Parra and Juan Francisco Salazar. MAC was built in the same site of the old Anwandter Brewery that collapsed during the 1960 Valdivia earthquake.

References

External links 

 

Art museums and galleries in Chile
Museums in Los Ríos Region
Museo de Arte Contemporáneo
Modern art museums
Art museums established in 1994
Museo de Arte Contemporáneo
University museums in Chile
Museo de Arte Contemporáneo